KFYN-FM 104.3 FM is a radio station licensed to Detroit, Texas.  The station broadcasts a Country and Red Dirt Country format. KFYN is owned by Vision Media Group, Inc.

References

External links
KFYN-FM's official website

FYN-FM
Country radio stations in the United States
Americana radio stations